House Party: Original Motion Picture Soundtrack is the soundtrack album to Reginald Hudlin's 1990 musical comedy film House Party. It was released through Motown on March 9, 1990 along with the film, and consisted of a blend of hip hop and R&B music. Recording sessions took place at Mastersound Recording Studios in Atlanta, and New York-based studios Romil Recording, Sigma Sound Studios, Skyline Studios, Greene Street Recording Studio, Bayside Sound Recording Studio, Marley's House, Pearl Street Studios. Production was handled by Gene Griffin, Hurby "Luv Bug" Azor, The Invincibles, Artz & Kraftz, Charles Ernst, Eric "Vietnam" Sadler, Full Force, Hank Shocklee, Keith Shocklee, Kenny Pollock, Kenny Vaughan and Marley Marl, with film director Reginald Hudlin and film producer Warrington Hudlin served as executive producers. It features contributions from film stars Kid 'n Play, as well as Artz & Kraftz, Cheryl Pepsii Riley, E-Crof, Ex-Girlfriend, Flavor Flav, Force MDs, Kenny Vaughan, Lisa Lisa and Cult Jam, LL Cool J, Marley Marl, The Art of Love, Today and UTFO.

The soundtrack made it to number 104 on the Billboard 200 and number 20 on the Top R&B Albums chart in the United States.

It preceded two sequel albums: 1991's House Party 2 and 1994's House Party 3.

Track listing

Notes
 signifies bonus track(s) appeared on CD only
 signifies bonus track(s) from 2015 reissue

Other songs
The following songs did appear in the film, but were not included in the soundtrack:
 "Bad Boy/Having a Party" written by Luther Vandross, Marcus Miller, Sam Cooke and performed by Luther Vandross
 "Hey Love" written by Wilber Hart and performed by The Delfonics (prod. by Stan Watson & Company)
 "Run 4 Cover" written and performed by Eric B. & Rakim
 "Shake It Up" written by Marcus Miller, Lenny White, Bernard Wright and performed by the Jamaica Boys
 "Niggerish" written by Andre Foxxe Williams, Tracey Lewis and performed by Parliament
 "Bull Pen Blues" written by Hurby Azor, performed by Kid 'n Play (prod. by Hurby "Love Bug" Azor and The Invincibles)

Chart positions

References

External links

Motown soundtracks
Hip hop soundtracks
1990 soundtrack albums
Comedy film soundtracks
House Party (film series)
Contemporary R&B soundtracks
Albums produced by Hurby Azor
Albums produced by Marley Marl
Albums recorded at Sigma Sound Studios
Albums recorded at Greene St. Recording